Stéphane Larue (born 1983 in Longueuil, Quebec) is a Canadian novelist from Quebec. His debut novel, Le Plongeur, was a shortlisted finalist for the Governor General's Award for French-language fiction at the 2017 Governor General's Awards.

The novel also won the Prix des libraires du Québec and the Prix Senghor.

The Dishwasher, a translation of Le Plongeur by Pablo Strauss, was published on August 6, 2019 by Biblioasis. The translated edition won the Amazon.ca First Novel Award in 2020. 

The Dishwasher, a film adaptation by Francis Leclerc, premiered in 2023.

References

1983 births
21st-century Canadian novelists
Canadian male novelists
Canadian novelists in French
People from Longueuil
Writers from Quebec
French Quebecers
Université de Montréal alumni
Living people
21st-century Canadian male writers
Amazon.ca First Novel Award winners